Plouvien is a commune in the Finistère department of Brittany in north-western France. The journalist and writer Jean Bothorel was born in Plouvien on 12 May 1940.

Population
Inhabitants of Plouvien are called in French Plouviennois.

Breton language
The municipality launched a linguistic plan concerning the Breton language through Ya d'ar brezhoneg on 24 May 2007.

In 2008, 7.54% of primary-school children attended bilingual schools.

See also
Communes of the Finistère department
List of the works of Bastien and Henry Prigent

References

External links

Official website 

Mayors of Finistère Association 

Communes of Finistère